A cookie (American English), or a biscuit (British English), is a baked or cooked snack or dessert that is typically small, flat and sweet. It usually contains flour, sugar, egg, and some type of oil, fat, or butter. It may include other ingredients such as raisins, oats, chocolate chips, nuts, etc.

Most English-speaking countries call crunchy cookies "biscuits", except for the United States and Canada, where "biscuit" refers to a type of quick bread. Chewier biscuits are sometimes called "cookies" even in the United Kingdom. Some cookies may also be named by their shape, such as date squares or bars.

Biscuit or cookie variants include sandwich biscuits, such as custard creams, Jammie Dodgers, Bourbons and Oreos, with marshmallow or jam filling and sometimes dipped in chocolate or another sweet coating. Cookies are often served with beverages such as milk, coffee or tea and sometimes dunked, an approach which releases more flavour from confections by dissolving the sugars, while also softening their texture. Factory-made cookies are sold in grocery stores, convenience stores and vending machines. Fresh-baked cookies are sold at bakeries and coffeehouses.

Terminology

In many English-speaking countries outside North America, including the United Kingdom, the most common word for a crisp cookie is "biscuit". The term "cookie" is normally used to describe chewier ones. However, in many regions both terms are used. The container used to store cookies may be called a cookie jar.

In Scotland the term "cookie" is sometimes used to describe a plain bun.

Cookies that are baked as a solid layer on a sheet pan and then cut, rather than being baked as individual pieces, are called in British English bar cookies or traybakes.

Etymology

The word cookie dates from at least 1701 in Scottish usage where the word meant "plain bun", rather than thin baked good, and so it is not certain whether it is the same word. From 1808, the word "cookie" is attested "...in the sense of "small, flat, sweet cake" in American English. The American use is derived from Dutch koekje "little cake,"  which is a diminutive of "koek" ("cake"), which came from the Middle Dutch word "koke". Another claim is that the American name derives from the Dutch word koekje or more precisely its informal, dialect variant koekie which means little cake, and arrived in American English with the Dutch settlement of New Netherland, in the early 1600s.

According to the Scottish National Dictionary, its Scottish name derives from the diminutive form  (+ suffix -ie) of the word cook, giving the Middle Scots cookie, cooky or cu(c)kie. There was much trade and cultural contact across the North Sea between the Low Countries and Scotland during the Middle Ages, which can also be seen in the history of curling and, perhaps, golf.

Description

Cookies are most commonly baked until crisp or else for just long enough to ensure soft interior. Other types of cookies are not baked at all, such as varieties of peanut butter cookies that use solidified chocolate rather than set eggs and wheat gluten as a binder. Cookies are produced in a wide variety of styles, using an array of ingredients including sugars, spices, chocolate, butter, peanut butter, nuts, or dried fruits. 

A general theory of cookies may be formulated in the following way. Despite its descent from cakes and other sweetened breads, the cookie in almost all its forms has abandoned water as a medium for cohesion. Water in cakes serves to make the batter as thin as possible, the better to allow bubbles—responsible for a cake's fluffiness—to form. In the cookie the agent of cohesion has become some form of oil. Oils, whether in the form of butter, vegetable oils, or lard, are much more viscous than water and evaporate freely at a far higher temperature. Thus a cake made with butter or eggs in place of water is much denser after removal from the oven.

Rather than evaporating as water does in a baking cake, oils in cookies remain. These oils saturate the cavities created during baking by bubbles of escaping gases. These gases are primarily composed of steam vaporized from the egg whites and the carbon dioxide released by heating the baking powder. This saturation produces the most texturally attractive feature of the cookie, and indeed all fried foods: crispness saturated with a moisture (namely oil) that does not render soggy the food it has soaked into.

History

Cookie-like hard wafers have existed for as long as baking is documented, in part because they survive travel very well, but they were usually not sweet enough to be considered cookies by modern standards.

Cookies appear to have their origins in 7th century AD Persia, shortly after the use of sugar became relatively common in the region. They spread to Europe through the Muslim conquest of Spain. By the 14th century, they were common in all levels of society throughout Europe, from royal cuisine to street vendors. The first documented instance of the figure-shaped gingerbread man was at the court of Elizabeth I of England in the 16th century. She had the gingerbread figures made and presented in the likeness of some of her important guests.

With global travel becoming widespread at that time, cookies made a natural travel companion, a modernized equivalent of the travel cakes used throughout history. One of the most popular early cookies, which traveled especially well and became known on every continent by similar names, was the jumble, a relatively hard cookie made largely from nuts, sweetener, and water.

Cookies came to America through the Dutch in New Amsterdam in the late 1620s. The Dutch word "koekje" was Anglicized to "cookie" or cooky. The earliest reference to cookies in America is in 1703, when "The Dutch in New York provided...'in 1703...at a funeral 800 cookies...'"

The most common modern cookie, given its style by the creaming of butter and sugar, was not common until the 18th century. The Industrial Revolution in Britain and the consumers it created saw cookies (biscuits) become products for the masses, and firms such as Huntley & Palmers (formed in 1822), McVitie's (formed in 1830) and Carr's (formed in 1831) were all established. The decorative biscuit tin, invented by Huntley & Palmers in 1831, saw British cookies exported around the world. In 1891, Cadbury filed a patent for a chocolate-coated cookie.

Classification

Cookies are broadly classified according to how they are formed or made, including at least these categories:
  Bar cookies consist of batter or other ingredients that are poured or pressed into a pan (sometimes in multiple layers) and cut into cookie-sized pieces after baking. In British English, bar cookies are known as "tray bakes". Examples include brownies, fruit squares, and bars such as date squares.
 Drop cookies are made from a relatively soft dough that is dropped by spoonfuls onto the baking sheet. During baking, the mounds of dough spread and flatten. Chocolate chip cookies (Toll House cookies), oatmeal raisin (or other oatmeal-based) cookies, and rock cakes are popular examples of drop cookies. This may also include thumbprint cookies, for which a small central depression is created with a thumb or small spoon before baking to contain a filling, such as jam or a chocolate chip. In the UK, the term "cookie" often refers only to this particular type of product.
 Filled cookies are made from a rolled cookie dough filled with a fruit, jam or confectionery filling before baking. Hamantashen are a filled cookie.
 Molded cookies are also made from a stiffer dough that is molded into balls or cookie shapes by hand before baking. Snickerdoodles and peanut butter cookies are examples of molded cookies. Some cookies, such as hermits or biscotti, are molded into large flattened loaves that are later cut into smaller cookies.
 No-bake cookies are made by mixing a filler, such as cereal or nuts, into a melted confectionery binder, shaping into cookies or bars, and allowing to cool or harden. Oatmeal clusters and rum balls are no-bake cookies.
 Pressed cookies are made from a soft dough that is extruded from a cookie press into various decorative shapes before baking. Spritzgebäck is an example of a pressed cookie.
 Refrigerator cookies (also known as icebox cookies) are made from a stiff dough that is refrigerated to make the raw dough even stiffer before cutting and baking. The dough is typically shaped into cylinders which are sliced into round cookies before baking. Pinwheel cookies and those made by Pillsbury are representative.
 Rolled cookies are made from a stiffer dough that is rolled out and cut into shapes with a cookie cutter. Gingerbread men are an example.
 Sandwich cookies are rolled or pressed cookies that are assembled as a sandwich with a sweet filling. Fillings include marshmallow, jam, and icing. The Oreo cookie, made of two chocolate cookies with a vanilla icing filling, is an example.

Other types of cookies are classified for other reasons, such as their ingredients, size, or intended time of serving:
 Breakfast cookies are typically larger, lower-sugar cookies filled with "heart-healthy nuts and fiber-rich oats" that are eaten as a quick breakfast snack.
 Low-fat cookies or diet cookies typically have lower fat than regular cookies.
 Raw cookie dough is served in some restaurants, though the eggs may be omitted since the dough is eaten raw, which could pose a salmonella risk if eggs were used. Cookie Dough Confections in New York City is a restaurant that has a range of raw cookie dough flavors, which are scooped into cups for customers like ice cream.
 Skillet cookies are big cookies that are cooked in a cast-iron skillet and served warm, while they are still soft and chewy. They are either eaten straight from the pan or cut into wedges, often with vanilla ice cream on top.
 Supersized cookies are large cookies such as the Panera Kitchen Sink Cookie. These very large cookies are sold at grocery stores, restaurants and coffeeshops.
 Vegan cookies can be made with flour, sugar, nondairy milk and nondairy margarine. Aquafaba icing can used to decorate the cookies.
Cookie cakes are made in a larger circular shape usually with writing made of frosting.

Reception
Leah Ettman from Nutrition Action has criticized the high calorie count and fat content of supersized cookies, which are extra large cookies; she cites the Panera Kitchen Sink Cookie, a supersized chocolate chip cookie, which measures 5 1/2 inches in diameter and has 800 calories. For busy people who eat breakfast cookies in the morning, Kate Bratskeir from the Huffington Post recommends lower-sugar cookies filled with "heart-healthy nuts and fiber-rich oats". A book on nutrition by Paul Insel et al. notes that "low-fat" or "diet cookies" may have the same number of calories as regular cookies, due to added sugar.

Popular culture
There are a number of slang usages of the term "cookie". The slang use of "cookie" to mean a person, "especially an attractive woman" is attested to in print since 1920. The catchphrase "that's the way the cookie crumbles", which means "that's just the way things happen" is attested to in print in 1955. Other slang terms include "smart cookie” and “tough cookie.” According to The Cambridge International Dictionary of Idioms, a smart cookie is “someone who is clever and good at dealing with difficult situations.”  The word "cookie" has been vulgar slang for "vagina" in the US since 1970. The word "cookies" is used to refer to the contents of the stomach, often in reference to vomiting (e.g., "pop your cookies" a 1960s expression, or "toss your cookies", a 1970s expression). The expression "cookie cutter", in addition to referring literally to a culinary device used to cut rolled cookie dough into shapes, is also used metaphorically to refer to items or things "having the same configuration or look as many others" (e.g., a "cookie cutter tract house") or to label something as "stereotyped or formulaic" (e.g., an action movie filled with "generic cookie cutter characters").
"Cookie duster" is a whimsical expression for a mustache.

Cookie Monster is a Muppet on the long-running children's television show Sesame Street. He is best known for his voracious appetite for cookies and his famous eating phrases, such as "Me want cookie!", "Me eat cookie!" (or simply "COOKIE!"), and "Om nom nom nom" (said through a mouth full of food).

Notable varieties

 Alfajor
 Angel Wings (Chruściki)
 Animal cracker
 Anzac biscuit
 Berger cookie
 Berner Haselnusslebkuchen
 Biscotti
 Biscuit rose de Reims
 Black and white cookie
 Blondie
 Bourbon biscuit
 Brownie
 Butter cookie
 Chocolate chip cookie
 Chocolate-coated marshmallow treat
 Congo bar
 Digestive biscuit
 Fat rascal
 Fattigmann
 Flies graveyard
 Florentine biscuit
 Fortune cookie
 Fruit squares and bars (date, fig, lemon, raspberry, etc.)
 Ginger snap
 Gingerbread house
 Gingerbread man
 Graham cracker
 Hamentashen
 Hobnob biscuit
 Joe Frogger
 Jumble
 Kifli
 Koulourakia
 Krumkake
 Linzer cookie
 Macaroon
 Meringue
 Nice biscuit
 Oatmeal raisin cookie
 Pastelito
 Peanut butter blossom cookie
 Peanut butter cookie
 Pepparkakor
 Pfeffernüsse
 Pizzelle
 Polvorón
 Qurabiya
 Rainbow cookie
 Ranger Cookie
 Rich tea
 Riposteria
 Rosette
 Rum ball
 Rusk
 Russian tea cake
 Rock cake
 Sablé
 Sandbakelse
 Şekerpare
 Shortbread
 Snickerdoodle
 Speculoos
 Springerle
 Spritzgebäck (Spritz)
 Stroopwafel
 Sugar cookie
 Tea biscuit
 Toruń gingerbread
 Tuile
 Wafer
 Windmill cookie

Gallery

Related pastries and confections

 Acıbadem kurabiyesi
 Animal crackers
 Berliner (pastry)
 Bun
 Candy
 Cake
 Churro
 Cracker (food)
 Cupcake
 Danish pastry
 Doughnut
 Funnel cake
 Galette
 Graham cracker
 Hershey's Cookies 'n' Creme
 Kit Kat
 Halvah
 Ladyfinger (biscuit)
 Lebkuchen
 Mille-feuille
 Marzipan
 Mille-feuille (Napoleon)
 Moon pie
 Pastry
 Palmier
 Petit four
 Rum ball
 S'more
 Snack cake
 Tartlet
 Teacake
 Teething biscuit
 Whoopie pie

Manufacturers

 Arnott's Biscuits
 Bahlsen
 Burton's Foods
 D.F. Stauffer Biscuit Company
 DeBeukelaer 
 Famous Amos (Division of Ferrero)
 Fazer
 Fox's Biscuits
 Interbake Foods
 Jules Destrooper
 Keebler
 Lance
 Lotte Confectionery (Division of Lotte)
 Lotus Bakeries
 McKee Foods
 Meiji Seika Kaisha Ltd.
 Mrs. Fields
 Nabisco (Division of Mondelēz International)
 Nestlé
 Northern Foods
 Otis Spunkmeyer (Division of Aryzta)
 Pillsbury (Division of General Mills)
 Pinnacle Foods
 Pepperidge Farm (Division of Campbell Soup Company)
 Royal Dansk (Division of Kelsen Group)
 Sunshine Biscuits (historical)
 United Biscuits
 Walkers Shortbread
 Utz Brands

Product lines and brands

 Animal Crackers (Nabisco, Keebler, Cadbury, Bahlsen, others)
 Anna's (Lotus)
 Archway Cookies (Lance)
 Barnum's Animals (Nabisco)
 Betty Crocker (General Mills, cookie mixes)
 Biscoff (Lotus)
 Chips Ahoy! (Nabisco)
 Chips Deluxe (Keebler)
 Danish Butter Cookies (Royal Dansk)
 Duncan Hines (Pinnacle, cookie mixes)
 Famous Amos (Kellogg)
 Fig Newton (Nabisco)
 Fox's Biscuits (Northern)
 Fudge Shoppe (Keebler)
 Girl Scout cookie (Keebler, Interbake)
 Hello Panda (Meiji)
 Hit (Bahlsen)
 Hydrox (Sunshine, discontinued by Keebler)
 Jaffa Cakes (McVitie)
 Jammie Dodgers (United)
 Koala's March (Lotte)
 Leibniz-Keks (Bahlsen)
 Little Debbie (McKee)
 Lorna Doone (Nabisco)
 Maryland Cookies (Burton's)
 McVitie's (United)
 Milano (Pepperidge Farm)
 Nilla Wafers (Nabisco)
 Nutter Butter (Nabisco)
 Oreo (Nabisco)
 Pillsbury (General Mills, cookie mixes)
 Pecan Sandies (Keebler)
 Peek Freans (United)
 Pirouline (DeBeukelaer)
 Stauffer's (Meiji)
 Stella D'Oro (Lance)
 Sunshine (Keebler)
 Teddy Grahams (Nabisco)
 Toll House (Nestle)
 Tim Tam (Arnott's)
 Vienna Fingers (Keebler)

Miscellaneous

 Christmas cookie
 Cookie cutter
 Cookie dough
 Cookie exchange
 Cookie Clicker
 Cookie Monster
 Cookie sheet
 Cookie table
 Cookies and cream
 Girl Scout cookie

See also

 Dunking (biscuit)
 List of baked goods
 List of cookies
 List of shortbread biscuits and cookies
 List of desserts
 Cookie Clicker

References

Further reading

External links

 
 
Desserts
Iranian desserts
Snack foods
Types of food